Vihiga County is an administrative region in the former Western Province of Kenya whose headquarters are in Mbale, the largest town in the county. The county has a population of 554,622 (2009 census) and an area of 563 km2. Formally a district, Vihiga  was split from Kakamega District in 1990. In 2019's census, Vihiga was found to have a population of 590, 013, an increase of 35, 391 from the 2009's count.

Local authorities

Administrative divisions

Constituencies
The district has five constituencies: 
Emuhaya Constituency
Hamisi Constituency
Sabatia Constituency
Vihiga Constituency
Luanda Constituency

Notable people
Moses Mudavadi Cabinet minister
Musalia Mudavadi Kenya's 7th Vice President of Kenya.

References

External links
Office for the Coordination of Humanitarian Affairs – Kenya AdminLevels 1-4 (.pdf)

 
Counties of Kenya